Tipi: Home of the Nomadic Buffalo Hunters is an illustrated, non-fiction, young adult picture book by Caldecott-winning author and illustrator Paul Goble.  It was published by World Wisdom Books in 2007.

Content
Tipi: Home of the Nomadic Buffalo Hunters is a reference book that documents the history and construction, as well as culture and spiritual significance of the tipi to the Plains Indians.  The material is covered at both the large and small scale; offering information on the Plain Indians in general as well as individual tribes (including diagrams and illustrations of specific famous tipis).

When asked about the book, Goble explained "This book is the kind of book I began looking for, but never found. So I have made it for you."

Awards
This book has been nominated for several awards, including:

Child/Young-Adult Non-Fiction (2007), MIPA
Nature (2007), MIPA
Juvenile Nonfiction (2007), ForeWord Magazine
 Interior Design, Children's/Young Adult (2008), Publishers Marketing Association

See also
Tipi
Paul Goble
World Wisdom

References

2007 children's books
American picture books
Non-fiction books about Native Americans
Native American children's literature
Indigenous architecture
Tipis